Onset station is a former train station located on Depot Street in the village of East Wareham, Massachusetts. One of seven railroad stations in Wareham, Massachusetts, it known by a variety of names, including Onset, Agawam, East Wareham, Onset Bay, Onset Beach, and Onset Junction. Passenger service to Onset ended on June 30, 1959, when the New York, New Haven & Hartford Railroad ended passenger service on its Old Colony division.

The former station building is today used by an antique store that is located behind Depot Motors in East Wareham.

See also
Wareham Village station
Tremont station

References

External links

Stations along Old Colony Railroad lines